Hluboká nad Vltavou (until 1885 Podhrad) is a town in České Budějovice District in the South Bohemian Region of the Czech Republic. It has about 5,400 inhabitants. The town is known for the Hluboká Castle.

Administrative parts
Villages of Bavorovice, Buzkov, Hroznějovice, Jaroslavice, Jeznice, Kostelec, Líšnice, Munice, Poněšice and Purkarec are administrative parts of Všemyslice.

Etymology
The name of the town was taken from the name of the local castle. The castle was named Frauenberg in German, which was derived from Old German vrôburg (i.e. "Lord's castle"). The Czech name Hluboká literally means "deep" and originated from the location of the castle above a deep valley.

Geography
There are many fish ponds in the municipal territory.

Hluboká nad Vltavou lies mostly in the Tábor Uplands, but the southern part with the ponds lies in the České Budějovice Basin, and the eastern part extends into the Třeboň Basin. The northern part of the large municipal territory is covered by forests.

History

History of the town is connected with a castle, which was founded together with the city of České Budějovice by King Ottokar II of Bohemia on a rocky promontory above the Vltava river. A settlement was founded under the castle and named Podhrad (literally meaning "Undercastle").

The castle later passed to the Vítkovci dynasty. Again purchased by the royal chamber in the 14th century, it was a favourite residence of Emperor Charles IV, who often visited the castle when residing in České Budějovice.

Held by the local noble Vilém II of Pernštejn from 1490 onwards, castle and town prospered. In 1496, the settlement was promoted to a market town.

Though seized by French forces in the Thirty Years' War, the acquisition by the Schwarzenberg family in 1661 brought even greater wealth to the area. After a blaze in 1742, the medieval fortress was slighted and rebuilt into a Renaissance castle, then between 1839 and 1871 into the current Neo-Gothic castle.

The first Jews came into Hluboká around 1724. The old synagogue was replaced by a new one in 1907, but it ceased to serve its purpose after its interior was destroyed by the Nazis during World War II.

The present-day municipality arose in 1850. The majority of the population was Czech-speaking. The town was renamed after the Hluboká Castle in 1885. In 1907, Hluboká became a town by decision of Franz Joseph I.

Demographics

Education
The Townshend International School has been based in the town since 1992.

Sights

The main landmark of Hluboká nad Vltavou is the Tudor-style Hluboká Castle. Every year it is one of the most visited castles in the country.

The second significant castle in Hluboká nad Vltavou is Ohrada Castle. It is a Baroque hunting castle built in 1708–1713. In 1842, the Hunting Museum, one of the oldest museums in the country, was established here. It still exist under the name Museum of Forestry, Hunting and Fishing, and is administered by National Museum of Agriculture in Prague.

Next to the castle there is a zoological garden, colloquially known as Ohrada Zoo. It breeds about 300 species of animals.

Notable people
Alfred I, Prince of Windisch-Grätz (1787–1862), Austrian general, married Princess Eleonore of Schwarzenberg here on 15 June 1817
František Mareš (1857–1942), professor and politician; died here 
Eduard Bloch (1872–1945), doctor of Adolf Hitler's family until 1907
Miroslav Dvořák (1951–2008), ice hockey player
Martin Latka (born 1984), footballer

Twin towns – sister cities

Hluboká nad Vltavou is twinned with:
 Bolligen, Switzerland
 Grein, Austria
 Neustadt an der Aisch, Germany

References

External links

 – Portal for citizens 
Tourist portal

Cities and towns in the Czech Republic
Populated places in České Budějovice District
Prácheňsko